José Álvarez (born 7 October 1947) is a Mexican sports shooter. He competed at the 1980 Summer Olympics, the 1984 Summer Olympics and the 1988 Summer Olympics.

References

External links

1947 births
Living people
Mexican male sport shooters
Olympic shooters of Mexico
Shooters at the 1980 Summer Olympics
Shooters at the 1984 Summer Olympics
Shooters at the 1988 Summer Olympics
Place of birth missing (living people)
Pan American Games medalists in shooting
Pan American Games silver medalists for Mexico
Shooters at the 1975 Pan American Games
21st-century Mexican people
20th-century Mexican people